Jehangir Khot was born on (1 July 1913 – 24 March 1990). He was a Right-hand batsman and Right-arm off-break bowler. Played first-class cricket in the early 1900s who competed for Bombay in the Ranji Trophy. An all-rounder, Jehangir Khot also represented Parsees (Parsi) /ˈpɑːrsiː/ and Railways.

He took a hat-trick in the 1943–44 Ranji Trophy playing for Bombay against Baroda. He became the first bowler to take five wicket haul in each innings of a Ranji Trophy final when he did this feat for Mumbai against Mysore in the 1941-42 season.

Teams
Main FC Cricket: Parsees (1935/36–1945/46); Bombay (1935/36–1950/51): Railways (India) (1958/59)

Other FC Cricket: Dr. C R Pereira's XI (1946/47); MK Mantri's XI (1947/48)

Ranji Trophy: Bombay (1935/36–1950/51); Railways (India) (1958/59)

Personal life
Jehangir Behramji Khot, son of Behramji Ratanji Khot & Cooverbai Behramji Khot. Married to Kati Mehta, had a son Behramji Jehangir Khot. After the death of his wife Kati Mehta, Jehangir Khot married to Banoo Khodaiji.

He died in Bombay (now Mumbai), Maharashtra, India on 26 March 1990.

See also
 List of hat-tricks in the Ranji Trophy

References

1913 births
1990 deaths
Indian cricketers
Parsees cricketers
Mumbai cricketers
Railways cricketers